Moisés Rojas-Alou Beltré (born July 3, 1966) is a Dominican-American former outfielder in Major League Baseball who played for 17 seasons in the National League. In 1,942 career games, Alou had a batting average of .303 with 2,134 hits, 421 doubles, 332 home runs, and 1,287 runs batted in.

Alou is one of the few modern baseball players who batted without the use of batting gloves. Instead, Moisés Alou revealed that during the baseball season, he'd urinate on his hands to toughen them up.

Baseball career

Alou was more interested in playing basketball during his youth and did not play organized baseball until he attended Cañada College in Redwood City, California, at the age of 18. It was there that baseball scouts noticed his bat speed and speed on the base paths. In , Alou was the second overall pick in the MLB January Draft, chosen by the Pittsburgh Pirates.

Montreal Expos
In , he was traded to the Montreal Expos where he would later play under his father while he managed the Expos.

Alou suffered a severe ankle injury in  that would rob him of his speed and force him to become strictly a corner outfielder. For the next two seasons, he would enjoy success at the plate in Montreal, although surgery to both shoulders prematurely ended his  season.

Florida Marlins
Prior to the  season, Alou signed as a free agent with the Florida Marlins, where he led the team with 23 home runs and 115 RBIs. The Marlins made the playoffs as a wild card team and defeated the San Francisco Giants in the National League Divisional Series. The Marlins then defeated the Atlanta Braves in the National League Championship Series before going to the World Series, which Florida won in seven games. Alou led the team by hitting .321 with 3 home runs and 9 RBI in the World Series (although, pitcher Liván Hernández, by virtue of his wins in Games 1 and 5, was named the Series Most Valuable Player instead).

Houston Astros
Before the  season, the Marlins traded Alou to the Houston Astros. In his first season with the team, Alou hit a career-high 38 home runs and drove in 124 runs while leading the Astros to a (then) franchise-record 102 wins. However, he tore his ACL in a treadmill accident in the offseason and missed the entire  season. After the 2001 season, the Astros did not offer Alou a new contract due to budget restraints, making him a free agent.

Chicago Cubs

In December 2001, he signed a three-year, $27 million contract with the Chicago Cubs.

At the start of the 2002 season Alou again ended up on the disabled list, and once healthy, he hit .275 and 15 home runs. After the 2002 season, Alou hired a personal trainer and dedicated himself to returning to his old form. In the  season, Alou batted over .300 for most of the season before a late-season slump dropped his season batting average to .280, with 22 home runs and 91 RBI. Alou went on to lead the team in batting average in its two series against the Atlanta Braves and Florida Marlins.

In Game 6 of the National League Championship Series against the Florida Marlins that year, Alou was involved in the Steve Bartman incident, in which Cubs fan Steve Bartman deflected a foul ball landing one row into the stands. Bartman's deflection prevented Alou, who reached into the stands, from attempting to catch the ball for an out that could have been the second out of the 8th Inning. However, the Marlins went on to score eight runs in the inning, in which the Cubs had been ahead 3–0. The Cubs, who had led the series 3–2, lost the game 8–3 and eventually lost the series in 7 games. Alou openly admitted later in interviews that while he was frustrated at the moment, he could not have made the catch anyway. Later, Alou denied making such a statement and said if he had, it was only to make Bartman feel better.

In , Alou set new career highs in home runs (39) and doubles (36), while driving in 106 runs. However, the Cubs missed the playoffs after losing seven of their last nine games. The Cubs refused to offer arbitration and let him go, citing numerous fights with umpires who, he claimed, had a vendetta against him.

San Francisco Giants and New York Mets
In October 2004, Alou announced that he had talked to his father, Felipe, about possibly playing for him and the Giants next season. In December 2004, he signed a one-year deal with the Giants worth $13.5 million, with a player option for a second year. Alou was expected to regularly play in right field for the first time since 2001, but because of injuries to left fielder Barry Bonds, he started most games in left field. They did not, and Alou exercised his option to stay with San Francisco in the  season, hitting 22 home runs and 74 RBI.

After hitting .318 in his first month as the regular left fielder, Alou suffered a torn quadriceps muscle and was forced out until August. Upon his return, Alou led the Mets with a .345 batting average and had a 30-game hitting streak. The streak was the longest streak of the  season, was the longest hitting streak by a player over age 40, and broke the Mets' overall and single-season hitting streak records. On October 31, 2007, the Mets exercised their option on Alou's contract for the 2008 season.
 
On March 5, 2008, Alou underwent hernia surgery and missed the start of the 2008 season. On July 9, Alou suffered a torn right hamstring playing in the outfield for AA Binghamton in Norwich, Connecticut. Mets general manager Omar Minaya stated in a press conference the following day that Alou would likely need surgery and miss the remainder of the 2008 season, which ended his career.

On March 5, 2009, Alou announced that he would retire after the World Baseball Classic.

Post playing career 
In 2014, in his first year of Hall of Fame eligibility, Alou received six votes (1.1%) and was dropped from subsequent ballots.

Personal life
He is the youngest of three sons born to Felipe and his first wife Maria Beltre, who raised him in the Dominican Republic after his parents divorced when he was two.  

His father Felipe, who managed Moises with the Expos from 1992 to 1996 and the Giants from 2005 to 2006, as well as uncles Matty and Jesús, and cousin Mel Rojas, all had long careers in Major League Baseball. In 2008, he was one of four active major leaguers (along with Prince Fielder, Ken Griffey Jr., and Daryle Ward) to hit 20 home runs in a season whose fathers had also hit 20 home runs in an MLB season. 

His half-brother, Luis Rojas, was the manager of the New York Mets in 2020 and 2021.

See also

 Alou family
 Houston Astros award winners and league leaders
 List of Dominican Americans
 List of Houston Astros team records
 List of Major League Baseball career doubles leaders
 List of Major League Baseball career games played as a left fielder leaders
 List of Major League Baseball career hits leaders
 List of Major League Baseball career home run leaders
 List of Major League Baseball career putouts as a left fielder leaders
 List of Major League Baseball career runs scored leaders
 List of Major League Baseball career runs batted in leaders
 List of Major League Baseball career slugging percentage leaders
 List of Major League Baseball players from the Dominican Republic
 List of second-generation Major League Baseball players

References

External links

, or Retrosheet

1966 births
Living people
Águilas Cibaeñas players
Moises
American expatriate baseball players in Canada
American sportspeople of Dominican Republic descent
Augusta Pirates players
Baseball players from Atlanta
Binghamton Mets players
Brooklyn Cyclones players
Buffalo Bisons (minor league) players
Cañada Colts baseball players
Chicago Cubs players
Daytona Cubs players
Florida Marlins players
Gulf Coast Mets players
Harrisburg Senators players
Houston Astros players
Indianapolis Indians players
Macon Pirates players
Major League Baseball left fielders
Montreal Expos players
National League All-Stars
New York Mets players
Pittsburgh Pirates players
St. Lucie Mets players
Salem Buccaneers players
San Francisco Giants players
Silver Slugger Award winners
Watertown Pirates players
World Baseball Classic players of the Dominican Republic
2006 World Baseball Classic players
2009 World Baseball Classic players